Pravir Chandra Bhanj Deo, King of Bastar (Pravir Chandra Bhanj Dev 25 June 1929 – 25 March 1966) was the 20th Maharaja of Bastar state who was shot in 1966 after a long career championing the rights of his subjects and in particular those of tribal peoples. He represented the Jagdalpur Assembly constituency in the undivided Madhya Pradesh Legislative Assembly following the general election of 1957.

He was the last ruler of Bastar state, which was established by a branch of the Kakatiya dynasty. The Bastar region was part of greater Kalinga kingdom and an extension of Trikalinga. The Kakatiya dynasty adopted the "Dev" or "Deo" surname in line with other feudal kings of Odisha under the Gajapati Kingdom in the medieval period. 

Pravir was born on 25 June 1929 and was educated at Rajkumar College, Raipur. He succeeded to the throne on 28 October 1936. He was married to Rajkumari Shubhraj Kumari of Patan, Rajasthan, daughter of Raj Rishi Rao Saheb Udaya Singhji and Rani Trilokya Raj Lakshmi of Patan, on 4 July 1961.

He was immensely popular among his people, as he took up the cause of the local tribal people, and provided political leadership against exploitation of natural resources of the region and corruption in land reforms. On 25 March 1966 he was killed, along with many of his tribal followers, when police opened fire on the King and a group of supporters at his palace in Jagdalpur. The official death toll was twelve, including the king, with twenty wounded; the police had fired sixty one rounds. The district magistrate was reported as stating that Pravir Chandra was leading armed adivasis against the police, who fired in self-defence.

See also
Bastar state
Kakatiya dynasty

References

1929 births
1966 deaths
People from Chhattisgarh
Assassinated royalty
Political repression in India
Assassinated Indian people
People murdered in Chhattisgarh
People shot dead by law enforcement officers in India
People from Jagdalpur
Place of birth missing
1966 murders in India